Nioki Airport  is an airport in Nioki, Democratic Republic of the Congo.

Airlines and destinations

See also

Transport in the Democratic Republic of the Congo
List of airports in the Democratic Republic of the Congo

References

External links

 OpenStreetMap - Nioki
 OurAirports - Nioki

Airports in Mai-Ndombe Province